Local elections took place in Pasig on Monday, May 9, 2022, as part of the 2022 Philippine general election.

Background 
Incumbent Vico Sotto was elected mayor of Pasig in 2019 and will seek a second consecutive term. Meanwhile, incumbent vice mayor Iyo Caruncho Bernardo was elected for a third consecutive term in 2019.

Retiring and term-limited incumbents

Term-limited incumbents 
These are incumbents who are on their third consecutive terms and cannot run for re-election but may run for other positions.

Vice mayor 
 Iyo Caruncho Bernardo (PRP), running for mayor of Pasig

1st District councilors 

 Ferdinand Avis (PDP–Laban)
 Rhichie Brown (Nacionalista), his wife Dottie is running for councilor in Pasig's 1st District as an independent candidate
 Ory Rupisan (PDP–Laban)

2nd District councilors 

 Olly Benito (Nacionalista), his wife Apple is running for councilor in Pasig's 2nd District as a candidate of the People's Reform Party under the Team Pasigueño slate
 Yoyong Martirez (Nacionalista), his son Maro is running for councilor in Pasig's 2nd District as a candidate of the Nationalist People's Coalition under the Giting ng Pasig slate
 Wilfredo Sityar (Nacionalista)

Retiring incumbents 
These incumbents were allowed to run for re-election for their positions, but chose not to.

1st District councilors 

 Joy San Buenaventura (Nacionalista)
 Edith Santiago (Nacionalista), her son Pao is running for councilor in Pasig's 1st District as a candidate of the Nationalist People's Coalition under the Giting ng Pasig slate

2nd District councilors 

 Jun-Jun Concepcion (PDDS), running for vice mayor of Pasig

Candidates

Mayor

Official candidates

Potential candidates
Robert Eusebio (Nacionalista), mayor of Pasig City (2007–2013, 2016–2019)

Vice mayor

House of Representatives

1st District councilors

2nd District councilors

Official candidates

Withdrawn candidates

Opinion polling

For Mayor

Results

Mayor 
Incumbent Vico Sotto defended the mayoralty against Vice Mayor Iyo Bernardo.

| colspan="5" |Source:

Vice Mayor 
Incumbent Iyo Bernardo is term-limited and chose to run for mayor. He nominated Christian "Ian" Sia as his vice mayoralty candidate, who lost to former congressman Dodot Jaworski.

| colspan="5" |Source:

District representative 
Incumbent congressman Roman Romulo defended his seat against former congressman Ricky Eusebio.

| colspan="5" |Source:

City Council

1st District 

|-bgcolor=black
|colspan=5|

2nd District 

|-bgcolor=black
|colspan=5|

References

2022 Philippine local elections
Elections in Pasig
May 2022 events in the Philippines
2022 elections in Metro Manila